30th & Downing station (sometimes styled as 30th•Downing) is a RTD light rail station in the Five Points neighborhood of Denver, Colorado, United States. Originally operating as part of the D Line, the station was opened on October 8, 1994, and is operated by the Regional Transportation District. It is the current northern terminus for Five Points trains.  Currently there is only one track on Welton Street for light rail trains, necessitating track sharing for trains in both directions between here and 20th & Welton.  Therefore, only one line serves this station and all stations on the Five Points branch.

History 
Along with the rest of the central rail line, 30th·Downing opened in 1994.

The January 14, 2018, service changes introduced the L Line, which now serves this station in place of the D Line.

References 

RTD light rail stations in Denver
Railway stations in the United States opened in 1994
Five Points, Denver
1994 establishments in Colorado